Christian electronic dance music, also known as CEDM, Christian EDM, Christian Dance Music, CDM, or Christian electronic music is a genre of electronic dance music and Christian music. Its musical styles closely mirror non-Christian EDM; however, the CEDM culture's lack of drug use and emphasis on positive lyrics (often focused on Christianity-based principles) distinguish it from non-religious counterparts. EDM.com wrote "the [CEDM] culture can feel quite welcoming." Many live concerts and events have been held in Christian churches in addition to traditional venues such as Lumination, Creation Festival and LifeLight Music Festival. CEDM has also been incorporated into some Christian worship routines.

Popular Figures

During the late 2000s and early 2010s several Christian electronic artists rose to prominence in Christian music and general popular music, those include G-Powered, Owl City, and Kye Kye. Other mainstay artists in the genre include Capital Kings, LZ7, DJ Flubbel, Gawvi, Hillsong Young & Free, Andy Hunter LE37, NONAH, Ocean Avenue, Oiwolf, Matthew Parker, Bryson Price, Re5a, Red Letter Hymnal, Reyer, Tony Foxx, and Transform DJs.

CEDM also includes other subgenres included in EDM, such as dubstep, techno, deep house and trance. There also is a perception of genre-blending between CEDM and Contemporary Christian music. A significant number of artists from this genre tend not to reference themselves as solely Christian music due the crossover with other genres,. There also is a perception of genre-blending between CEDM and Contemporary Christian music, such as Christian hip-hop musicians Andy Mineo, Lecrae, and Kanye West.

Reception 
In September 2014, Hallels.com conducted an interview with CEDM artist Matthew Parker, and claimed that some in the Christian community deem dance music as, "music of the devil", to which Parker replied, "I don't believe any rhythms, melodies, chords, or harmonies are inherently evil and belong to the devil. Frankly, I think that's stupid."

Zurich Lewis of the Biola University Chimes wrote an article aimed at Christians distinguishing the harmful elements of the EDM culture (such as drug use) from the musical style of the genre itself.

In 2014, Matt Shea of Noisey wrote a tongue-in-cheek blog post, saying "Nay, the Lord has spoken, and he has done so through womps...Hallelujah!"

Radio 
Usually broadcast on Christian radio broadcasts, there are internet radio stations that specifically broadcast CEDM, such as Radio U Fusion: EDM, NRT Radio Remix, God's DJs, URLive, and GLOW. NRT Radio and David Thulin partnered to create a CEDM radio show, The Reconstruction, which seeks to promote Christian EDM.

References

 
Contemporary Christian music
Electronic dance music genres